Automatic writing, also called psychography, is a claimed psychic ability allowing a person to produce written words without consciously writing.

Automatic writing may also refer to:
 a method of writing texts in which the writer suppresses conscious control over the making process, see Surrealist automatism
 an autopen or signing machine used for the automatic signing of a signature or autograph
 Automatic Writing, a music piece by American composer Robert Ashley (1979)
 Automatic Writing (album), debut studio album by American experimental rock band Ataxia (2004)

See also
 Automatic painting (disambiguation)